Casey Jones (1864–1900) was an American railroad engineer.

Casey Jones may also refer to:

People
Casey Jones (ice hockey) (born 1968), Canadian ice hockey coach
Casey Jones (politician) (1915–2002), former member of the Ohio House of Representatives; also a professional basketball player in the NBL during the 1940s
Casey Jones (catcher) (1918–1998), American Negro league baseball player
Casey Jones (outfielder), American Negro league baseball player
Casey Jones (musician) (1939–2017), solo blues artist and former drummer for guitarist Albert Collins
Casey Veggies (born 1993), hip hop artist
Casey Jones, former member of Blessed by a Broken Heart
Casey Jones (1936–2022), stage name of British singer Brian Cassar
Casey Jones, alternate identity for radio personality Al Anthony
Casey Jones, television persona of Lunch With Casey show host Roger Awsumb
Casey Jones, author of the American comic book All Fall Down

Music
"The Ballad of Casey Jones", a c. 1909 folk song about the railroad engineer
"Casey Jones" (song), a 1970 song by the Grateful Dead, also about the railroad engineer
Casey Jones (band), a straight edge hardcore punk band from Florida

Fiction
Casey Jones (play), a 1938 play by Robert Ardrey
Casey Jones (TV series), a 1957 television show starring Alan Hale Jr
Casey Jones (Teenage Mutant Ninja Turtles), a character from the Teenage Mutant Ninja Turtles series
Casey Jones (film), a 2011 fan film based on the Teenage Mutant Ninja Turtles character

See also
K. C. Jones (1932–2020), American basketball player and coach
K. C. Jones (American football) (born 1974), American football center